Ebenavia boettgeri is a small species of gecko that is native to the island of Madagascar. It is sometimes considered conspecific with Ebenavia inunguis.

References

Ebenavia
Reptiles of the Indian Ocean
Reptiles described in 1885